Doing It Wrong may refer to:
"Doing It Wrong", a song from the album Take Care by Drake
"Doing It Wrong", the theme song of the TV series Some Girls, sung by Anita Blay (CocknBullKid)
Doing It Wrong (DIW), in scuba-diving, failure to comply with the principles of Doing It Right (DIR), from the point of view of exponents of DIR

See also
"Maybe I'm Doing It Wrong", a track from the album Sail Away by Randy Newman
Doing It Right (disambiguation)